Michael Sendivogius (2 February 1566 – 1636) was a Polish alchemist, philosopher, and medical doctor. A pioneer of chemistry, he developed ways of purification and creation of various acids, metals and other chemical compounds. He discovered that air is not a single substance and contains a life-giving substance—later called oxygen—170 years before Scheele's discovery of the element. He correctly identified this 'food of life' with the gas (also oxygen) given off by heating nitre (saltpetre). This substance, the 'central nitre', had a central position in Sendivogius' schema of the universe.

Biography

Little is known of his early life: he was born in a noble family that was part of the Clan of Ostoja. His father sent him to study in university of Kraków but Sendivogius visited also most of the European countries and universities; he studied at Vienna, Altdorf, Leipzig and Cambridge. His acquaintances included John Dee and Edward Kelley. It was thanks to him that King Stephen Báthory agreed to finance their experiments. In the 1590s he was active in Prague, at the famously open-minded court of Emperor Rudolf II.

In Poland he appeared at the court of King Sigismund III Vasa around 1600, and quickly achieved great fame, as the Polish king was himself an alchemy enthusiast and even conducted experiments with Sendivogius. In Kraków's Wawel castle, the chamber where his experiments were performed is still intact. The more conservative Polish nobles soon came to dislike him for encouraging the king to expend vast sums of money on chemical experimentation. The more practical aspects of his work in Poland involved the design of mines and metal foundries. His widespread international contacts led to his employment as a diplomat from about 1600.

In his later years, Sendivogius spent more time in Bohemia and Moravia (now in the Czech Republic), where he had been granted lands by the Habsburg emperor. Near the end of his life, he settled in Prague, in the court of Rudolf II, where he gained even more fame as a designer of metal mines and foundries. However the Thirty Years' War of 1618-48 had effectively ended the golden age of alchemy: the rich patrons now spent their money on financing war rather than chemical speculation, and he died in relative obscurity.

Works
Daniel Stolcius in his Viridarium Chymicum (1624) praises Sendivogius as the author of twelve books. The most famous of these was his "New Chemical Light", published in 1604. Besides a relatively clear exposition of his theory on the existence of a 'food of life' in air, his books contain various scientific, pseudo-scientific and philosophical theories, and were repeatedly translated and widely read among such worthies as Isaac Newton into the 18th century.

Sendivogius in fiction

In early 2000s he appeared in several books by the Polish writer Andrzej Pilipiuk (Kuzynki 2003, Księżniczka 2004, Dziedziczki 2005). Sendivogius is also a character in the novel of Gustav Meyrink (part of Goldmachergeschichten, August Scherl Verlag, Berlin 1925), a German author from Prague, Bohemia, who often wrote about alchemy and alchemists.

The Polish 19th-century realist painter Jan Matejko depicted Sendivogius demonstrating a transmutation of a base metal into gold before King Sigismund III Vasa.

He was also shown (thinly disguised) as the Alchemist Sendivogius in a Polish TV series in the 1980s.

Writings
De Lapide Philosophorum Tractatus duodecim e naturae fonte et manuali experientia depromti. 1604. 
 Also known as Novum Lumen Chymicum (New Chemical Light), the first Latin editions were published simultaneously in Prague and Frankfurt.
Dialogus Mercuriii, Alchemistae et Naturae. Cologne, 1607. 
Tractatus de sulphure altero naturae principio. Cologne, 1616.

See also
Alchemy in art and entertainment

Notes

References
 Prinke, Rafał T. “Beyond Patronage: Michael Sendivogius and the Meanings of Success in Alchemy” In Chymia: Science and Nature in Medieval and Early Modern Europe, edited by Miguel López Pérez, Didier Kahn, and Mar Rey Bueno. Newcastle-upon-Tyne: Cambridge Scholars Publishing, 2010.
 Prinke, Rafal T. MICHAEL SENDIVOGIUS and CHRISTIAN ROSENKREUTZ The Unexpected Possibilities, The Hermetic Journal (1990), 72-98. 
 Prinke, Rafał T. “Nolite Me Inquirere (Nechtějte se po mně ptáti): Michael Sendivogius.” In Alchymie a Rudolf II: Hledání Tajemství Přírody ve Střední Evropě v 16. a 17. Století, edited by Ivo Purš and Vladimír Karpenko, 317–35. Praha: Artefactum, 2011.
 Sendivogius, Michael.The Alchemical Letters of Michael Sendivogius to the Rosicrucian Society. Holmes Pub Group Llc. 
 Szydło, Zbigniew. Water which does not wet hands. The alchemy of Michael Sendivogius. London-Warsaw, 1994.
 Polish edition: Woda, która nie moczy rąk. Alchemia Michała Sędziwoja.. Wydawnictwa Naukowo-Techniczne: Warszawa, 1997.

External links 
 Sendivogius.pl, website about the life and works of MIchal Sedziwoj
 MICHAEL SENDIVOGIUS and CHRISTIAN ROSENKREUTZ: The Unexpected Possibilities online
 LETTERS OF MICHAEL SENDIVOGIUS TO THE ROSEYCRUSIAN SOCIETY FOUND IN AN OLD MANUSCRIPT BY EBENEZER SIBLY M.D. 1791
 A letter from Michael Sendivogius to Vincenzo II Gonzaga, duke of Mantua (1562-1612)
 The 16th Century Alchemist Who Discovered Oxygen
 TRANSMUTATION, an episode of the podcast Stories From The Eastern West all about Sendivogius and alchemy in the Middle Ages 
 Works by Michael Sendivogius in digital library Polona

Clan of Ostoja
16th-century Polish nobility
1566 births
1636 deaths
16th-century alchemists
17th-century alchemists
Jagiellonian University alumni
People from Limanowa County
Polish chemists
17th-century Polish philosophers
Polish alchemists
Polish inventors
17th-century Polish nobility